Scorpaenini is a tribe of marine ray-finned fishes, one of two tribes in the subfamily Scorpaeninae. This tribe contains the "typical" or "true" scorpionfishes. The taxonomy of the scorpionfishes is in some flux, the 5th Edition of Fishes of the World treats this taxa as a tribe within the subfamily Scorpaeninae of the family Scorpaenidae within the order Scorpaeniformes, while other authorities treat it as a subfamily within a reduced family Scorpaenidae within the suborder Scorpaenoidei, or the superfamily Scorpaenoidea within the order Perciformes.

Genera
The tribe Scorpaenini contains at least 17 genera and nearly 200 species:

 Hipposcorpaena Fowler, 1938
 Hoplosebastes Schmidt, 1929
 Idiastion Eschmeyer, 1965
 Iracundus Jordan & Evermann, 1903
 Neomerinthe Fowler, 1935
 Neoscorpaena Mandrytsa, 2001
 Parascorpaena Bleeker, 1876
 Phenacoscorpius Fowler, 1938
 Pogonoscorpius Regan, 1908
 Pontinus Poey 1860
 Pteroidichthys Bleeker, 1856
 Rhinopias Gill, 1905
 Scorpaena Linnaeus, 1758
 Scorpaenodes Bleeker, 1857
 Scorpaenopsis Heckel 1837
 Sebastapistes Gill, 1877
 Taenianotus Lacépède, 1802
 Thysanichthys Jordan & Starks, 1904
 Ursinoscorpaenopsis Nakabo & Yamada, 1996

References

Scorpaeninae
Taxa named by Antoine Risso
Fish tribes